Mahoba district is one of the districts of Uttar Pradesh state of India and Mahoba town is the district headquarters. Mahoba district is a part of Chitrakoot Division. The district occupies an area of 2884 km². It has a population of 875,958 (2011 census). As of 2011 it is the least populous district of Uttar Pradesh (out of 75). Mahoba District is also known as Alha-Udal Nagari.

History

This district was carved out from the erstwhile Hamirpur district on 11 February 1995 by separating the Kulpahar, Charkhari and Mahoba tehsils from it. Mahoba is associated with Chandela kings who ruled in Bundelkand between 9th to 12th centuries.

Divisions
The district comprises three tehsils: Mahoba, Charkhari and Kulpahar, comprising four development blocks: Kabrai, Charkhari, Jaitpur and Panwari.

There are five urban local bodies (two Nagar Palika Parishads and three Nagar Panchayats):
Mahoba (NPP), Charkhari (NPP), Kabrai (NP), Kulpahar (NP) and Kharela (NP).

There are 10 police stations including woman police station in the district.

There are two Vidhan Sabha constituencies in this district: Mahoba and Charkhari. Both are part of Hamirpur Lok Sabha constituency.

General administration 
The district is a part of Chitrakoot division, headed by the Divisional Commissioner, who is an IAS officer of high seniority. The District Magistrate & Collector, hence, reports to the Divisional Commissioner of Chitrakoot Division. The current Divisional Commissioner is Dinesh Kumar Singh (IAS).

Mahoba district administration is headed by the District Magistrate & Collector (DM), who is an IAS officer. The DM is in charge of land revenue, law and order and supervises all development activities the district.

The District Magistrate is assisted by one Chief Development Officer, one Additional District Magistrate i.e. ADM (Finance & Revenue), and three Sub Divisional Magistrates. The current DM of Mahoba is Manoj Kumar Chauhan (IAS).

Police administration 
Mahoba district comes under Prayagraj police zone and Chitrakoot police range of Uttar Pradesh Police. Prayagraj zone is headed by an IPS officer in the rank of Additional Director General of Police (ADG), whereas Chitrakoot range is headed by an IPS officer in the rank of Inspector General of Police (IG).

District Police of Mahoba is headed by the Superintendent of Police (SP) who is an IPS officer and is accountable to the District Magistrate for Law and Order enforcement. He is assisted by one Additional Superintendent of Police. The Mahoba district is divided into three police circles, each headed by a Circle Officer in the rank of Deputy Superintendent of Police. The current SP is Sudha Singh.

Demographics

According to the 2011 census Mahoba district has a population of 875,958, roughly equal to the nation of Fiji or the US state of Delaware. This gives it a ranking of 469th in India (out of a total of 640). Its population growth rate over the decade 2001-2011 was 23.66%. Mahoba has a sex ratio of 880 females for every 1000 males, and a literacy rate of 66.94%. Scheduled Castes made up 25.22% of the population.

At the time of the 2011 Census of India, 65.50% of the population in the district spoke Hindi and 33.63% Bundeli as their first language.

Politics 
It is a part of the Mahoba Assembly constituency.

Notable people

 Ashok Kumar Singh Chandel - MLA, BJP
 Pushpendra Singh Chandel, MP, BJP
 Ganga Charan Rajput, Ex. MP

Economy
In 2006 the Ministry of Panchayati Raj named Mahoba one of the country's 250 most backward districts (out of a total of 640). It is one of the 34 districts in Uttar Pradesh currently receiving funds from the Backward Regions Grant Fund Programme (BRGF).

References

External links
 

 
Districts of Uttar Pradesh
Bundelkhand